Seraph is a DC Comics superhero from Israel. He first appeared in Super Friends #7 (October 1977), and was created by E. Nelson Bridwell and Ramona Fradon, art by Bob Oksner and lettered by Milt Snapinn.

Fictional character biography
Chaim Levon is a Jewish school teacher who wields mystical power. He helps Superman dismantle a bomb in Israel and free the Wonder Twins after they were brainwashed. He had a few missions as a solo fighter. As a member of the Global Guardians, he helped Superman retrieve an ancient artifact.

He remained with the Global Guardians for a few years, but declined an offering from the Queen Bee of Bialya, since he was Jewish and Bialya was an Islamic state. For a while, Seraph fought solo, trying to think of ways to revive the Global Guardians. Finally, Doctor Mist called him to Bialya to rescue the Global Guardians. The mission was successful. 

The team later confronts Doctor Mist's enemy Fain Y'onia. Thunderlord and Bushmaster die during separate confrontations with enemy. Seraph helps Rising Sun, Owlwoman, and Olympian create the New Global Guardians, placing himself as leader. Seraph also supervises the care of Tuatara who is in a coma as the result of the battle against Fain. He assists in erecting statues to his fallen friends.

His current status is unknown.

Powers and abilities
His powers are primarily derived from various mythic artifacts that were handed down to him by historic figures chronicled in the Torah.  

He wears the ring of Solomon that gives him wisdom and allows him to teleport short distances, and the mantle of Elijah that protects him from harm. The Staff of Moses can extend to whatever length he needed, and can transform into a serpent and manipulate water. Additionally, he sports long hair which he believes grants him super strength like Samson. He apparently can request spectacular miracles from "a higher power" as he needs them. For instance, in a Pre-Crisis adventure, he was battling villains who threatened to blow up a desalination plant while several children were being held hostage with the villains threatening to kill them. With no alternative, Seraph personally beseeched this higher power to temporarily stop the flow of time. Although the villains shot at their hostages just when that request was made, it was granted and all time stopped except for Seraph who disarmed the bomb and covered the children with his cloak to protect them from the weapons fire before allowing time to resume and defeat his enemies.

See also
Hayoth
Sabra, an Israeli superhero in the Marvel Comics universe.

References

External links
DCU Guide: Seraph

DC Comics superheroes
Fictional schoolteachers
Comics characters introduced in 1977
DC Comics characters with superhuman strength
Fictional Jews in comics
Fictional Israeli Jews
Jewish superheroes
Israeli superheroes